Eesti tippmodell, season 3 is the third installment of the Estonian adaptation of America's Next Top Model founded by Tyra Banks. The judges for this season are Urmas Väljaots, Thomas Volkmann, and Liisi Eesmaa, who also serves as the show's host. This was the first season of the show to feature males within the final cast. The season began to air on December 4, 2014.

The winner of the competition was 16-year-old Aule Õun from Karksi-Nuia. As her prizes she received an all expenses paid trip to France to meet with Major model management in Paris. She was also signed with a model school managed by Paolo Moglia. Furthermore, she won the chance of being featured in the April issue of Redbook Magazine as well as making an appearance on the cover of Cosmopolitan.

Episode summaries

Episode 1
Original Air Date: 4 December 2014

Casting episode.

Featured photographer: Oliver Moosus

Episode 2
Original Air Date: 11 December 2014

First call-out: 	Liise Hanni
Bottom two: Hanna-Maria Sell & Kristina Trees	
Eliminated: Hanna-Maria Sell
Featured photographer: James Holm

Episode 3
Original Air Date: 18 December 2014

First call-out: Mona Kattel
Bottom two: Kristina Trees & Stefani Kask
Eliminated: Kristina Trees
Featured photographer: Kristiin Kõosalu

Episode 4
Original Air Date: 8 January 2015

First call-out: Hendrik Adler 
Bottom two: Mona Kattel & Sandro Pullakbutu
Eliminated: Mona Kattel
Featured photographer: Kristjan Lepp

Episode 5
Original Air Date: 15 January 2015

First call-out: Jekaterina Bulgarina 
Bottom two: Hristina Parimskaja & Kevin Sarapuu
Eliminated: Hristina Parimskaja
Featured photographer: Krõõt Tarkmeel

Episode 6
Original Air Date: 22 January 2015

First call-out: Jekaterina Bulgarina 
Bottom two: Aule Õun & Gerili Narusing
Eliminated: None
Featured photographer: Erik Riikoja

Episode 7
Original Air Date: 29 January 2015

First call-out: Hendrik Adler
Bottom two: Liise Hanni & Stefani Kask
Eliminated: Stefani Kask
Featured photographer: Kirill Gvozdev

Episode 8
Original Air Date: 5 February 2015

First call-out: Liise Hanni
Bottom two: Hendrik Adler & Kevin Sarapuu
Eliminated: Kevin Sarapuu
Featured photographer: Kalle Veesaar

Episode 9
Original Air Date: 12 February 2015

First call-out: Jekaterina Bulgarina 
Bottom two: Liise Hanni & Sandro Pullakbutu	
Eliminated: None
Featured photographer: Toomas Volkmann

Episode 10
Original Air Date: 19 February 2015

First call-out: None
Bottom two: None
Eliminated: None
Featured photographer: Alessio Migliardi

Episode 11
Original Air Date: 26 February 2015

First call-out: Gerili Narusing
Bottom two: Aule Õun & Sandro Pullakbutu
Eliminated: Sandro Pullakbutu
Featured photographers:  Anu Hammer & Aivo Kallas

Episode 12
Original Air Date: 5 March 2015

First call-out: Jekaterina Bulgarina
Bottom two: Gerili Narusing & Liise Hanni
Eliminated: Gerili Narusing
Featured photographers: Egert Kamenik & Oliver Moosus

Episode 13
Original Air Date: 5 March 2015

Recap episode.

Episode 14
Original Air Date: 12 March 2015

Final four: Aule Õun, Hendrik Adler, Jekaterina Bulgarina & Liise Hanni		 
Estonia's Next Top Model: Aule Õun

Contestants
(ages are stated at start of contest)

Summaries

Call-out order

 The contestant was eliminated
 The contestant was in a non-elimination bottom two
 The contestant won the competition

 Episode 1 was the casting episode.
 Episode 6 featured a non-elimination bottom two.
 In episode 9, Liise and Sandro landed in the bottom two. The judges chose not to eliminate them. Instead, they missed out on the trip overseas the following episode as a punishment.
 In episode 10, no panel was held. Only the Milan fashion show and Magnum shoot took place that week.
 Episode 13 was the recap episode.

Photo shoot guide
Episode 1 photo shoot: Grouped with dogs in B&W (casting)
Episode 2 photo shoot: Posing with an Opel race car
Episode 3 photo shoot: Modeling with toddlers
Episode 4 photo shoot: 60s fashion with a vintage mustang
Episode 5 photo shoot: Christmas Eve in pairs
Episode 6 photo shoot: Selling shoes on an iceberg
Episode 7 photo shoot: Twofold optical illusion
Episode 8 photo shoot: Roccoco renaissance fashion
Episode 9 photo shoot: Fashion accessories in B&W
Episode 10 photo shoot: Magnum ice cream campaign
Episode 11 photo shoots: Geishas & Taikomochi covered in milk; Cosmopolitan editorial
Episode 12 photo shoots: Underwater fabric; portraying celebrities
Episode 14 photo shoot: Cosmopolitan covers

References

External links
 Official Show Website

Eesti tippmodell
2014 Estonian television seasons
2015 Estonian television seasons